Gymnopilus ombrophilus is a species of mushroom in the family Hymenogastraceae.

See also

List of Gymnopilus species

External links
Gymnopilus ombrophilus at Index Fungorum

ombrophilus
Fungi of North America